The first season of I'm a Celebrity...Get Me Out of Here premiered on Network Ten on 1 February 2015. The season was hosted by Julia Morris and Chris Brown. Andrew 'Freddie' Flintoff won the season, getting crowned King of the Jungle on 15 March 2015.

Celebrities

Results and elimination
 Indicates that the celebrity received the most votes from the public
 Indicates that the celebrity received the fewest votes and was eliminated immediately (no bottom two)
 Indicates that the celebrity was named as being in the bottom 2, or bottom 3

Intruder trials
Before the new contestants ('intruders') enter camp and meet the other celebrities, they have to undergo trials.
 Anna and Tim took part in the "Bite Club" tucker trial as their entry to the jungle.
 Julie had to rescue Freddie by releasing him from a 'net' trap.  Later, Freddie and Julie spent a night at the "Hard Rocks Hotel", so they could deliver luxury items to the celebrities already in camp.

Notes
 The number of tucker trials, given next to each of the celebrities' names, does not include either "Celebrity Stampede", or "Walk the Line", or "Africarnage", as all remaining celebrities competed in these three tucker trials.

Tucker trials

The contestants take part in daily trials to earn food. These trials aim to test both physical and mental abilities. The winner is usually determined by the number of stars collected during the trial, with each star representing a meal earned by the winning contestant for their camp mates.

 The public voted for who they wanted to face the trial
 The contestants decided who did which trial
 The trial was compulsory and neither the public nor celebrities decided who took part 
 The contestants were chosen by the evicted celebrities

Notes
 Laura chose not to participate in one of the three tanks, forfeiting three of the stars on offer. The celebrities won three stars, but were gifted a fourth (which was collected just out of the allotted time) by host Chris Brown.
 This trial was for three days worth of meals for camp.
 This trial was completed by Tim and Anna as part of their entry to camp.
 As new arrivals, Anna and Tim were exempt from this trial.
 As part of this trial, Laura had to choose two celebrities to take with her to assist her in the trial. She chose to take Andrew and Barry.
 The five meals were eaten by the women - while the men were in a secret camp location drinking beer and eating buckets of KFC (after winning a secret challenge).
 This trial was for three days worth of food for camp. Following a secret challenge, for St Valentine's Day, all the celebrities were given chocolate. 
 Joel and Barry were chosen for the tucker trial by evicted celebrities Tim and Laura.
 Lauren and Anna also won a bonus star for the group, which gave the group special beverages (a choice of beer or wine). Following the discovery of a contraband block of chocolate in camp, celebrities were told these drinks would be forfeited unless the chocolate was handed in. After discussion, the celebrities chose to hand in the chocolate and keep the drinks.
 Merv and Chrissie were both exempt from this trial on medical grounds.
 This trial was a 'team trial' and everyone competed, with Andrew and Chrissie as the team captains (as per the results of Australia's vote).  This trial was also a time trial, which Andrew's team won with a time of 21.08 seconds.  Chrissie's team's time was close, with a time of 22.25 seconds.  Both teams experienced delays.  Andrew's team-mates were: Julie, Anna, Barry, Freddie and Merv.  Chrissie's team-mates were: Joel, Maureen, Lauren and Tyson.  The teams had to collect the stars and out-run Tembo, the six-tonne elephant leader, and the other tracking elephants.  Both teams were successful in doing this.  Tembo the elephant leader brought the winning cup to Andrew as the winning captain.
 Andrew was chosen for the tucker trial by evicted celebrity Lauren.
 This trial was for three days worth of meals for camp. Based on the vote count, Freddie competed for the stars on the inside of the net and Barry competed for the stars on the outside of the net.
 Tyson and Anna were chosen for the tucker trial by evicted celebrity Andrew.
 The trial "Dreadfall" was originally planned for this episode, but was cancelled due to technical difficulties. Chrissie and Tyson had been selected to participate in this trial, but as the replacement trial "Flash Flood" only required one celebrity, Chrissie was chosen based on the vote count.
 Chrissie and Joel were chosen for the tucker trial by evicted celebrity Tyson.
 Freddie was chosen for the tucker trial by evicted celebrity Merv.
 The celebrities also won a bonus drink in this trial for collecting all six stars within 45 minutes.
 Barry was chosen for the tucker trial by evicted celebrities Anna and Joel.

Celebrity chest challenges

Two or more celebrities are chosen to take part in the "Celebrity Chest" challenge to win luxuries for camp. Each challenge involves completing a task to win a chest to take back to camp. However, to win the luxury item in the chest, the campmates must correctly answer a question. If they fail to answer correctly, the luxury item is forfeited and a joke prize is won. The luxury item is "donated" by a celebrity from the outside.

 The celebrities got the question correct
 The celebrities got the question wrong

Secret challenges

This is a challenge where some celebrities have to take part without alerting the other celebrities - if they are successful in their 'missions', they are rewarded.

The men's secret challenge
All of the men had to sneak into the Tok Tokkie (the confessional room) without the women noticing. The reward was a 'night out' away from the women, eating Kentucky Fried Chicken and drinking beer

Maureen's sneaky snacks
During week 4, Maureen was given a series of tasks from the Tok Tokkie. This task was for her to secretly share some treats with select campmates without the others knowing. 
 Coffee - Shared with Joel
 Koeksisters - Shared with Joel and Chrissie
 Garlic bread - Shared with Joel, Chrissie and Julie

The sneaky snacks trials were all undetected by the other campmates.  The reward, for all three sneaky snacks being successful, included coffee, milk, sugar, koeksisters and garlic bread for all the campmates.

Freddie's beg, borrow, steal
Freddie's Secret Challenge, given to him at the Tok Tokkie, was to use other celebrities luxury items. His 3 tasks were:
 Obtain Joel's picture of Harry Styles
 Use Chrissie's mirror and put it into his bag
 Sit on Barry's sheepskin bed without him noticing (Barry had recently barred him from doing so)
Freddie completed these tasks in the following ways:
 The picture was borrowed by stating to Joel he wanted it to overlay his son's picture on the frame because he was turning 9 today.
 Chrissie's mirror was stolen by placing a jar of salt in front of the flip mirror, distracting her from noticing he was taking the mirror
 The sheepskin was sat on while Barry was relatively close, and the other campmates warned him against it, but he went undetected.

The reward was 10 minutes of "grooming time" for all campmates, i.e. time with various grooming implements like shavers. Freddie unexpectedly shaved his head down the middle, leaving only tufts of lighter shade hair on the side.

Mystery box

Every day during week 5, a mystery box was delivered to the campsite. Each time the box was delivered, something different was found inside.
 The box contained Grant Denyer, who asked the celebrities questions based on events that occurred in the outside world - if the answers the celebrities gave were correct, they ate as much of their favourite food as they could in a minute.  If the answers were wrong, Grant Denyer ate their favourite food instead - in front of them.
 The box contained nine small containers of popcorn and a 'ticket' to see a 'horror' movie.  The movie turned out to be clips of the celebrities themselves, with footage taken from various 'tucker trials'.
 In the box was a 2-way-radio and a bike. The celebrities had to use the bike to power the radio. Once the radio was powered enough, the celebrities could communicate to the outside world (through the Fitzy and Wippa radio show).
 In the box was a note stating that letters from home were up for grabs and that they would have to answer a question to win the letter. However each celebrity was playing for someone else's letter.

Craft club
One of the notable activities to occur throughout the series was the Craft Club. Andrew began a craft club, making various wooden utensils, including a wooden spoon and chopsticks for his campmates, as well as making knitting needles for Julie.  Julie took threads from a cloth bag, in which the luxury goods were brought into camp, and knitted various items including a headband for Freddie and a scarf for Joel, as well as a night mask for Chrissie's eyes.

Ratings

Ratings data is from OzTAM and represents the live and same day average viewership from the 5 largest Australian metropolitan centres (Sydney, Melbourne, Brisbane, Perth and Adelaide).

References

01
2015 Australian television seasons